"A Chance" is a song written by Dean Dillon and Royce Porter and recorded by American country music artist Kenny Chesney.  It was released in September 1997 as the second single from Chesney's 1997 album I Will Stand.  The song reached number 11 on the US Billboard Hot Country Singles & Tracks chart.

Chart performance

References

1997 singles
Kenny Chesney songs
Songs written by Dean Dillon
Song recordings produced by Buddy Cannon
Song recordings produced by Norro Wilson
BNA Records singles
1997 songs
Songs written by Royce Porter